The Canada U-20 women's national soccer team is a youth soccer team operated under the Canadian Soccer Association.  Its primary role is the development of players in preparation for the full women's national team. Their most recent major competition was the 2020 CONCACAF Women's U-20 Championship.

History
Canada hosted the inaugural FIFA U-20 Women's World Cup in 2002 (U-19 prior to 2006). They won silver led by future star Christine Sinclair, finishing runner-up to the United States in a close 0–1 extra time defeat. Two years later, Canada won the 2004 CONCACAF Women's U-20 Championship, again on home soil in another final contested against the Americans. They would repeat the feat four years later in Mexico, defeating the United States to capture their second CONCACAF Women's U-20 title.

At the 2010 CONCACAF Women's U-20 Championship, Canada lost a critical third place match to Costa Rica, eliminating them from World Cup qualification for the first time.

Fixtures and results

 Legend

2022

Players

Current roster
The following players were named to the squad for the 2022 FIFA U-20 Women's World Cup.

Previous rosters
 2014 FIFA U-20 Women's World Cup
 2016 FIFA U-20 Women's World Cup
 2018 CONCACAF Women's U-20 Championship
 2020 CONCACAF Women's U-20 Championship

Competitive record

FIFA U-20 Women's World Cup record

CONCACAF Women's U-20 Championship record

See also

 Canada women's national under-17 soccer team
 Canada men's national youth soccer teams
 Soccer in Canada

References

under-20
North American women's national under-20 association football teams
North American national under-20 association football teams